Adrian Liu (born September 17, 1983) is a male Canadian  badminton player from Prince Rupert, British Columbia. He has been the top ranked men's individual and doubles player on the continent and a contender in major international competitions. He is a National champion in men's doubles and has won several international titles since 2010.

Career
Liu is one of the leaders of the Canadian badminton team. With partner Derrick Ng, the two are a force to be reckoned with in men's doubles in Pan American competition. One of the highlights was winning bronze at the 2011 Pan American Games. In 2014 the duo won the Pan American Championships, defeating the top seeds in the final. They successfully defended their titles from 2013 and 2012 when they had been the number one seeds. Liu's career-high doubles ranking is 25th, achieved in 2011.

Personal life
His parents are Steven and Katherine Liu and his younger sister Giselle. Liu who is of Chinese descent started playing badminton recreationally at aged 16, and began training full-time at 22 under coach Ronne Runtulalo. He graduated from Langara College in 2007 with a diploma in Human Kinetics.

Achievements

Pan American Games
Men's Doubles

Pan Am Championships
Men's Doubles

Mixed Doubles

BWF Grand Prix 
The BWF Grand Prix has two level such as Grand Prix and Grand Prix Gold. It is a series of badminton tournaments, sanctioned by Badminton World Federation (BWF) since 2007.

Men's Doubles

 BWF Grand Prix Gold tournament
 BWF Grand Prix tournament

BWF International Challenge/Series
Men's Doubles

Mixed Doubles

 BWF International Challenge tournament
 BWF International Series tournament

References

External links
 
 Profile at www.badminton.ca
 Profile at olympique.ca
 

Canadian male badminton players
Living people
1983 births
People from Prince Rupert, British Columbia
Sportspeople from British Columbia
Canadian people of Chinese descent
Commonwealth Games competitors for Canada
Badminton players at the 2014 Commonwealth Games
Badminton players at the 2011 Pan American Games
Pan American Games bronze medalists for Canada
Pan American Games medalists in badminton
Langara College people
Medalists at the 2011 Pan American Games